The  refers to a series of Japanese Antarctic expeditions for scientific research.

The first JARE expedition was launched in 1957 to coordinate with the International Geophysical Year. This was the team which left 15 dogs, including Taro and Jiro, behind after an emergency evacuation in February 1958.

Expeditions to the Antarctic took place from 1968 to 1977, and ice cores were drilled on these expeditions, mostly at Mizuho.

A later instance was an ecological expedition studying the ecosystems near Showa Station in Antarctica. The project was first undertaken in February 1986. It was associated with the international BIOTAS program, which also launched in 1986. Taxonomical studies of some organisms (particularly plants and small animals) were carried out by the expedition.

References

Sources

External links
 |BIOSPHERE|AQUATIC+ECOSYSTEMS|RIVERS%2FSTREAM+HABITAT&OrigMetadataNode=GCMD&EntryId=JP_ANTARCTIC_JARE_ECOSYS&MetadataView=Full&MetadataType=0&lbnode=mdlb3 NASA site detailing the 1986 expedition

Antarctic expeditions
Japanese Antarctic Program
Expeditions from Japan
1968 establishments in Japan